The 1953 St. Louis Browns season was the 53rd season in Browns history and their final in St. Louis. It involved the Browns finishing 8th in the American League with a record of 54 wins and 100 losses,  games behind the AL and World Series champion New York Yankees. After the season, the Browns moved to Baltimore, where they are now known as the Baltimore Orioles.

Offseason 
 October 14, 1952: Ray Coleman, Bob Mahoney, Stan Rojek and $95,000 were traded by the Browns to the Brooklyn Dodgers for Billy Hunter.
 October 16, 1952: Joe DeMaestri and Tommy Byrne were traded by the Browns to the White Sox for Hank Edwards and Willy Miranda.
 October 27, 1952: Jake Crawford was traded by the Browns to the Detroit Tigers for Neil Berry, Cliff Mapes and $25,000.
 December 4, 1952: Jay Porter, Owen Friend and Bob Nieman were traded by the Browns to the Detroit Tigers for Johnny Groth, Virgil Trucks and Hal White.

Regular season 
 May 6, 1953: In his first major league start, the Browns' Bobo Holloman pitched a no-hitter against the Philadelphia Athletics. The 27 year-old Holloman struck out three, walked five, and helped himself offensively by batting in three of the Browns' runs with a pair of singles in the Browns' 6–0 victory. (Holloman finished the season with a 3–7 record and did not pitch in the major leagues after 1953.)
 September 27, 1953: The Browns ended their 51-year residence in St. Louis, losing to the Chicago White Sox at home 2–1 in 11 innings to complete a sweep by the White Sox, giving the Browns 100 losses for the year. Official attendance was 3,174.

Season standings

Record vs. opponents

Notable transactions 
 July 23, 1953: Bobo Holloman was purchased from the Browns by the Toronto Maple Leafs for $7,500.
 September 1, 1953: Neil Berry was selected off waivers from the Browns by the Chicago White Sox.

Roster

Player stats

Batting

Starters by position 
Note: Pos = Position; G = Games played; AB = At bats; H = Hits; Avg. = Batting average; HR = Home runs; RBI = Runs batted in

Other batters 
Note: G = Games played; AB = At bats; H = Hits; Avg. = Batting average; HR = Home runs; RBI = Runs batted in

Pitching

Starting pitchers 
Note: G = Games pitched; IP = Innings pitched; W = Wins; L = Losses; ERA = Earned run average; SO = Strikeouts

Other pitchers 
Note: G = Games pitched; IP = Innings pitched; W = Wins; L = Losses; ERA = Earned run average; SO = Strikeouts

Relief pitchers 
Note: G = Games pitched; W = Wins; L = Losses; SV = Saves; ERA = Earned run average; SO = Strikeouts

Awards and honors 
1953 Major League Baseball All-Star Game
 Satchel Paige, reserve
Casey Stengel kept to his word and named Paige to the 1953 All-Star team despite Paige not having a very good year.  He got in the game in the eighth inning.  First Paige got Gil Hodges to line out, then after Roy Campanella singled up the middle, Eddie Mathews popped out.  He then walked Duke Snider and Enos Slaughter lined a hit to center to score Campanella.  National League pitcher Murry Dickson drove in Snider, but was thrown out at second base trying to stretch the hit into a double.  Paige ended the year with a disappointing 3–9 record, but a respectable 3.53 ERA.  Paige was released after the season when Veeck once again had to sell the team.

Farm system

Notes

References 

1953 St. Louis Browns team at Baseball-Reference
1953 St. Louis Browns season at baseball-almanac.com

St. Louis Browns seasons
Saint Louis Browns season
1953 in sports in Missouri